The 2022 ADCC Submission Fighting World Championship was an international submission grappling tournament held at the Thomas & Mack Center in Las Vegas, Nevada, USA, from 17–18 September 2022.

Background 
The ADCC World Championship is a submission grappling tournament held every two years, widely considered to be the most prestigious submission grappling tournament in the world. The 2022 edition of the ADCC world championships attracted some of the most high-profile sponsors that the tournament has ever seen, most notably The Joe Rogan Experience and ONE Championship.

The 14th edition of the championship was originally scheduled to take place in September 2021 but was postponed to 2022 due to the international travel restrictions and the global lockdowns caused by the Covid-19 pandemic. Competitors had to qualify by finishing first of a continental qualifying events, known as ADCC Trials, or by being invited to compete by the organisation. As a result of the delays associated with the pandemic, the second Asia and Oceania trial was cancelled and only seven trials events were conducted for ADCC 2022. Returning champions or previous world championships medallists were automatically qualified.

Competition highlights
 Sam McNally, the lowest-seeded competitor in the 66kg division  upset number one seed Garry Tonon in a 3-0 win. 
 Kade Ruotolo won the 77kg division at age 19 becoming the youngest-ever ADCC champion. 
 Haisam Rida won an upset victory by submitting Roberto "Cyborg" Abreu by arm-bar in the 99kg weight class. 
 PJ Barch won an upset victory against JT Torres to prevent him from winning his third consecutive ADCC world title. 
 Eoghan O'Flanagan surprised fans by defeating Xande Ribeiro and Mason Fowler, eventually finishing fourth in the 88kg division. 
 Amy Campo upset multiple-time ADCC champion Gabi Garcia, went to on win her division. 
 Ffion Davies became the first British ADCC world champion.   
 Gordon Ryan won the super-fight against André Galvão via rear naked choke.

As a result of the event's success, ADCC won 'Promotion of the Year' and the 2022 ADCC world championships won 'Fight Card of the Year' at the Jitsmagazine 2022 BJJ Awards. Diego 'Pato' Oliveira was also awarded with 'Submission of the Year' for his semi-final victory over Kennedy Maciel by Z-Lock.

Participants 
Men's divisions had sixteen competitors: eight qualified athletes, seven invitations and the defending ADCC champion. Women's divisions had eight competitors: approximately four qualified athletes, three invitations and the defending ADCC champion; there was some variation due to returning champions, invitees and trials winners moving into different weight divisions. Only the female winners of European, North and South American second trials or Asia & Oceania trial qualified for the World Championship.

Qualifiers

Invitees

ADCC 2022 Superfight 
The 2022 World Championship featured a superfight between André Galvão (ADCC Superfight champion, six ADCC titles ) vs Gordon Ryan (ADCC 2019 Absolute champion, unbeaten between 2018 and 2022). Ryan submitted Galvao at 16:04 via a rear-naked choke while holding a 12-0 lead.

Results

Men

Women

ADCC 2022 Awards 
 Best Athlete: Gordon Ryan
 Best Match: Vagner Rocha v Izaak Michell
 Best Throw: Nicholas Meregali
 Fastest Submission: Gordon Ryan

Notes

References 

Grappling competitions
No-Gi Brazilian jiu-jitsu competitions
Sports competitions in the United States
Sports competitions in Las Vegas
International sports competitions hosted by the United States
ADCC Submission Fighting World Championship